Colerain Township is the name of some places in the U.S. state of Pennsylvania:
Colerain Township, Bedford County, Pennsylvania
Colerain Township, Lancaster County, Pennsylvania

Pennsylvania township disambiguation pages